The Dodge Stratus is a mid-size car that was introduced by Dodge in December 1994 and was based on the 4-door sedan Chrysler JA platform. The Stratus, Plymouth Breeze, and Chrysler Cirrus were all on Car and Driver magazine's Ten Best list for 1996 and 1997. It received critical acclaim at launch, but ratings fell over time. An updated version of the Stratus was introduced for 2001, with the Cirrus being renamed as the Chrysler Sebring, and a coupé model was also added to the range. Production ended in early 2006 at the Sterling Heights Assembly Plant after building 1,308,123 Stratus and Sebrings since 2000. 

The Dodge Avenger replaced the Stratus nameplate in early 2007 for the 2008 model year.

After the discontinuation of the Stratus sedan in 2006, the assembly line and tooling were sold to the Russian concern, GAZ, which manufactured 9,000 units of a very slightly modified Stratus from 2008 through 2010 called the Volga Siber.

First generation (1995–2000)

The Dodge Stratus was the middle entry of the JA platform (with the Cirrus being the higher-end model and the Breeze being the lower-end model). Introduced in 1995, the Stratus had two models, the base (later renamed SE in 2000), which came standard with the 2.0 L straight-4 and had the SOHC 2.4 L as optional, and the ES, which came standard with the a 2.0 L from 1995 to 1997, and had a DOHC 2.4 L and a 2.5 L V6 as optional. In 1998 the DOHC 2.4 L was standard and the 2.5 L V6 was optional on the ES, and from 1999 to 2000, the 2.5 L V6 was the only engine on the ES model.

The Stratus directly replaced the high-volume Spirit and Dynasty (United States only) to favorable reviews, but lower sales. The Stratus was often compared to other small mid-sizes such as the Chevrolet Malibu, and judged roomier than the 1995 Ford Contour by many magazines such as Consumer Reports.

The Stratus, Cirrus, and Breeze had many parts that were interchangeable between each model. The exteriors of these three cars were very similar, with the front fascia, rear bumper, taillights, and wheels being the main differences. The interiors had little variation between the three models; being almost identical, save for the name on the steering wheel, and a few available options. The fascias of each JA car resembled each brand's minivan offering, sharing headlights and grill designs.

All three variants of the platform were available with most of the same standard features and available options, such as the following: a four-speed automatic transmission and an optional semi-automatic dubbed "Autostick" (not available on the Plymouth Breeze), anti-lock brakes, four-wheel independent suspension (double wishbone in the front with a multilink rear), tilt steering wheel, cruise control, power windows, power door locks, power driver's seat, leather seats (Cirrus only), power antenna, a six-CD changer, sunroof, remote keyless entry, anti-theft system, etc. A five-speed manual was available with the 2.0 L. The 2.4 L was not offered in a manual because of its high torque and difficult drivability issues, mainly due to wheel spinning.

International markets
In 2000, the Stratus was available for its last year of sales in Canada, with the Chrysler Sebring taking over as the company's only lower mid-size sedan - Dodge did not sell the equivalent version in Canada.

A turbocharged version of the Stratus was sold in Mexico, with the 2.4 L DOHC 4-cylinder engine and a 4-speed automatic transmission with AutoStick. The 2.4 L turbo engines were only available for the Mexican market.

The Stratus was sold in Europe, with the 2.0 L and the V6 engines, as the Chrysler Stratus (the Dodge name was not used in Europe, except for commercial vehicles). Its styling was similar to that of Chrysler's Cirrus (which featured chrome accent moldings along the doors and bumpers), with the exception of the rear taillights, which were the same as Dodge's Stratus, and a Dodge grille, which differed from that of the Chrysler Cirrus and Plymouth Breeze. The Chrysler Stratus competed in the Swedish Touring Car Championship; the Dodge branded model also competed in North American Touring Car Championship as one of few truly professional teams to compete in the short-lived championship, with David Donohue winning the 1997 season using a Stratus.

For Brazil, the Stratus was marketed as the Chrysler Stratus, the equivalent Chrysler Cirrus being unavailable. It had the same engines as the North American version but a higher ground clearance for the Brazilian road conditions.

In Argentina, it was marketed as the Chrysler Stratus, and it was raced in the category "Superturismo Sudamericano" (Copa de las Naciones), driven by Ernesto Bessone and Pablo Peon.

In several countries and U.S. jurisdictions, the Stratus and Cirrus were used as police vehicles.

Second generation (2000–2006)

In 2000, the Stratus became the last of the "Cloud Cars" when the Cirrus was renamed as the Sebring, and the Breeze was discontinued (along with the Plymouth brand). This generation of the Dodge Stratus was not sold in Canada, although 1999 was the last year for Dodge Stratus sales in Canada. The 2002 models no longer had the "DODGE" badges on the front doors.

The Stratus and Sebring sedans for the second generation used a revised version of the Chrysler JA platform named JR. The coupé models with the same names were entirely different cars; they were actually based on the Mitsubishi Eclipse.

During this time, sales declined as its ratings by consumer and auto magazines fell among competing mid-size cars. At the same time sedan market had shifted with the larger Intrepid and later Charger achieving record sales. The 2004 model year included styling revisions, but this did not improve sales. The Stratus was discontinued in May 2006 (the Sebring name was continued).

International markets
In Mexico, the Stratus R/T came in a turbocharged version. This version would later be used in the U.S. in the Dodge SRT-4 and PT Cruiser GT. Stratus R/T models with the turbocharged engine featured a "Turbo" badge on the rear.

Engines
2.4 L EDZ I4
2.4 L EDV/EDT I4
2.7 L EER V6

Stratus coupé

For 2001, Dodge introduced the Stratus coupé, replacing the discontinued Avenger. This model along with the Chrysler Sebring coupé were built at the former Diamond Star Motors plant by Mitsubishi, using the ST-22 platform. Like its Chrysler counterpart, the coupé models shared very little other than the name and a few exterior styling cues with sedan and convertible models. The Stratus coupé was restyled for the 2003 model year. The coupé was discontinued after 2005, one year before the sedan. The next midsize Dodge which replaced the Stratus, the Avenger, did not include a coupé version.

Engines
2.4 L 4G64 I4
3.0 L 6G72 V6

Safety
The first generation Dodge Stratus received a "Poor" rating in the IIHS frontal crash test. It was actually a Chrysler Cirrus that was tested, but the results also apply to the Stratus, and also the Plymouth Breeze. The second generation Stratus and its twin, the Chrysler Sebring, received an overall "Acceptable" rating in the IIHS frontal test due to a possible injury to the right leg. On the side test, the Stratus receives a "Poor" rating without optional side airbags due to a serious neck injury, a weak side structure, possible rib fractures, and high forces on the shoulder and pelvis. Its seats and head restraints earn an overall "Acceptable" rating from the IIHS.

Licensed production in Russia

The license and production facilities for the second generation Dodge Stratus and Chrysler Sebring sedans were sold in April 2006 to Russian billionaire Oleg Deripaska, owner of the GAZ company in Nizhny Novgorod, which builds the Volga automobile. The price for the production line and rights was approximately US$151 million (€124 million). The models were built by GAZ in Russia from late 2007 through 2010 as the Volga Siber. The production facilities were planned to build up to 65,000 cars of both models yearly. Four-cylinder engines were to be purchased from Chrysler and made in Mexico.

The Siber was introduced at the start of the Global Economic Crisis of 2008, and through an annual production of 40,000 vehicles had been planned, sales were not as expected and around 9,000 had been manufactured by the time the Siber was discontinued after the 2010 model year.

Sales

References 

Stratus
Front-wheel-drive vehicles
Flexible-fuel vehicles
Mid-size cars
Coupés
Sedans
2000s cars
Cars introduced in 1995